Nakata (written: 中田, literally central rice field) is a Japanese surname. Notable people with the surname include:

Daisuke Nakata (born 1974), Japanese trampolinist and Sasuke competitor
Hidetoshi Nakata (born 1977), Japanese football player
Hideo Nakata (born 1961), Japanese film director
Hiroki Nakata (born 1964), Japanese shogi player
Jōji Nakata (born 1954), Japanese voice actor
Kazuhiro Nakata (born 1958), Japanese voice actor
Kōji Nakata (born 1979), Japanese football player
, Japanese lawyer
, Japanese sport wrestler
Yasutaka Nakata (born 1980), Japanese music producer and DJ
, Japanese heptathlete

See also
Nakata Station, railway station in Tsugaru, Aomori Prefecture, Japan 
Nakada, and Tanaka (disambiguation), other Japanese surnames using the same kanji 中田.

Japanese-language surnames